Ren Ye (born July 13, 1986 in Fushun, Liaoning) is a field hockey player from China, who won a silver medal with the national women's hockey team at the 2008 Summer Olympics in Beijing.

References
 The Official Website of the Beijing 2008 Olympic Games

External links
 

1986 births
Living people
Chinese female field hockey players
Asian Games medalists in field hockey
Asian Games gold medalists for China
Field hockey players at the 2006 Asian Games
Field hockey players at the 2008 Summer Olympics
Field hockey players at the 2010 Asian Games
Field hockey players at the 2012 Summer Olympics
Medalists at the 2006 Asian Games
Medalists at the 2008 Summer Olympics
Medalists at the 2010 Asian Games
Olympic field hockey players of China
Olympic medalists in field hockey
Olympic silver medalists for China
People from Fushun
Sportspeople from Liaoning